The 1913 Mercer Baptists football team was an American football team that represented Mercer University as a member of the Southern Intercollegiate Athletic Association (SIAA) during the 1913 college football season. In their first year under head coach Lewie Hardage, the team compiled an 2–5–1 record, with a mark of 0–4–1 in the SIAA.

Schedule

References

Mercer
Mercer Bears football seasons
Mercer Baptists football